Solid is an album by American jazz guitarist Grant Green featuring performances recorded in 1964 but not released on the Blue Note label until 1979. McCoy Tyner, Elvin Jones and Bob Cranshaw from Green’s previous session are joined by alto saxophonist James Spaulding and tenor saxophonist Joe Henderson.

Reception

The Allmusic review by Steve Huey awarded the album 4½ stars and stated "Solid is a bright, hard-charging affair. There's a little modal jazz, but Solid's repertoire is chiefly complex hard bop, full of challenging twists and turns that the players burn through with enthusiasm. Green didn't tackle this kind of material — or play with this kind of group — very often, and it's a treat to hear him do so on both counts...  one of Green's strongest jazz outings and a unique standout in his catalog".

Track listing
 "Minor League" (Duke Pearson) – 7:05
 "Ezz-Thetic" (George Russell) – 10:41
 "Grant's Tune" (Grant Green) – 7:01
 "Solid" (Sonny Rollins) – 7:23
 "The Kicker" (Joe Henderson) – 6:23
 "Wives and Lovers"(*) (Burt Bacharach, Hal David) – 9:00

(*)Bonus track on CD reissue, from Matador

Personnel
Grant Green - guitar
James Spaulding - alto saxophone (tracks 1-5)
Joe Henderson - tenor saxophone (tracks 1-5)
McCoy Tyner - piano
Bob Cranshaw - bass
Elvin Jones - drums

References 

Blue Note Records albums
Grant Green albums
1979 albums
Albums produced by Alfred Lion
Albums recorded at Van Gelder Studio